The New York Civil Practice Law and Rules (CPLR) is chapter 8 of the Consolidated Laws of New York and governs legal procedure in the Unified Court System such as jurisdiction, venue, and pleadings, as well certain areas of substantive law such as the statute of limitations and joint and several liability
The CPLR has approximately 700 individual sections and rules which are divided into 70 articles. It has been the law of New York since 1962, when it replaced the older "Civil Practice Act". A committee of the New York State Bar Association, the Committee on Civil Practice Law and Rules, monitors the law and periodically proposes amendments.

See also
 Law of New York

References

External links
 Civil Practice Law and Rules from the Legislative Bill Drafting Commission
 Civil Practice Law and Rules from FindLaw
 Civil Practice Law and Rules from Justia
 New York CPLR (Redbook), 2015 Edition from LexisNexis

New York (state) law
New York Civil Practice Law and Rules
New York Civil Practice Law and Rules